Konithiwada is a village in the Veeravasaram Mandal in West Godavari District of Andhra Pradesh state, India. 
Aravalli Rail Way Station and Viravasaram Rail Way Station are the nearest train stations.

Demographics 

 Census of India, Konithiwada had a population of 8537. The total population constitutes 4281 males and 4256 females with a sex ratio of 994 females per 1000 males. 706 children are in the age group of 0–6 years, with sex ratio of 893. The average literacy rate stands at 77.14%.

References

Villages in West Godavari district